Hesketh Bank is a small agricultural village in Lancashire, England.  It lies to the north-east of the town of Southport on the Irish Sea estuary of the River Ribble.  The area falls under West Lancashire Borough Council for administrative purposes, and Hesketh-with-Becconsall Parish Council for parochial matters. The population of the civil parish at the 2011 census was 4,041. It is in the South Ribble parliamentary constituency.

Etymology
Hesketh was first recorded in 1288 as Heschath. The name is derived either from Old Norse hest shei meaning "race course", or from a plural of the Welsh hesg, meaning "sedges".

History
Due to its geographical location, close to the cities of Preston and Liverpool, the village suffered during the Second World War. Stray bombs hit the old church in 1943, and landed along Becconsall Lane, causing extensive damage to the housing there.

Landmarks

The village has some architectural gems such as Becconsall Old Church which was hit by bomb shrapnel during World War II, All Saints Church on Station Road replaced the old church and is of some architectural significance as is the Becconsall Public House, which shut in June 2009. It has now been redeveloped as housing, keeping the name alive as Becconsall Gardens.

The West Lancashire Light Railway is a narrow gauge railway that is located in Hesketh Bank.

Geography
Hesketh Bank lies just to the north of the larger village of Tarleton and the village of Banks (North Meols).

Economy

Due to the village's position on the West Lancashire Coastal Plain it has a rich soil, suitable for the farming of flowers and vegetables - this is still the main economic activity in the area.

A Booths supermarket opened on 11 November 2010.

Transport
The village is located just off the A59 Preston to Liverpool road and the A565 Southport Road has meant it has also developed as a commuter town.

Hesketh Bank railway station was once a stop on the West Lancashire Railway, which ran between Preston and Southport. The railway opened in 1878 was closed almost a century later, in 1964. The station site is now occupied by a housing estate.

Leisure

The village is home to football, cricket, badminton and crown green bowls clubs, the Hesketh Bank Silver Band and the West Lancashire Light Railway.

See also

Listed buildings in Hesketh-with-Becconsall

References

External links

Hesketh Bank commercial website
Hesketh-with-Becconsall Parish council website

Villages in Lancashire
Geography of the Borough of West Lancashire
Populated coastal places in Lancashire